In a Glass Darkly is a collection of five stories by Sheridan Le Fanu, first published in 1872, the year before his death. The second and third stories are revised versions of previously published stories. The first three stories are short stories, and the fourth and fifth are long enough to be called novellas (the fourth is over 44,500 words long, and the fifth is over 27,500 words long).

The title is taken from 1 Corinthians 13:12, a deliberate misquotation of the passage which describes humanity as perceiving the world "through a glass, darkly".

Stories
The stories, which belong to the Gothic horror and mystery genres, are presented as selections from the posthumous papers of the occult detective Dr. Martin Hesselius.

"Green Tea"
An English clergyman named Jennings confides to Hesselius that he is being followed by a demon in the form of an ethereal monkey, invisible to everyone else, which is trying to invade his mind and destroy his life. Hesselius writes letters to a Dutch colleague about the victim's condition, which gets steadily worse with time as the creature steps up its methods, all of which are purely psychological. The title refers to Hesselius' belief that green tea was what unsealed Jennings's "inner eye" and led to the haunting. Emanuel Swedenborg's book Arcana Cœlestia (1749) is cited on the power of demons.

"The Familiar"
A revised version of "The Watcher" (1851). A sea captain, living in Dublin, is stalked by "The Watcher", a strange dwarf who resembles a person from his past. He starts to hear accusatory voices all about him and eventually his fears solidify in the form of a sinister bird, a pet owl owned by his fiancée, Miss Montague.

"Mr. Justice Harbottle"
A revised version of "An Account of Some Strange Disturbances in Aungier Street" (1853). A cruel judge in the Court of Common Pleas, Elijah Harbottle, finds himself under attack by vengeful spirits, and in a disturbing dream he is condemned to death by a monstrous doppelgänger. The story is set between 1746 and 1748 and is retold by a Londoner, called Anthony Harman, from the account related in letters by an elderly friend.

The Room in the Dragon Volant
Not a ghost story but a notable mystery story, in 26 chapters, which includes the themes of drug-induced catalepsy and premature burial. A naïve young Englishman traveling in France attempts to save a beautiful and mysterious woman whom he is duped into believing to be the unhappily-married wife of the avaricious and sexagenarian count of St. Alyre. In the denouement it is revealed that the 'St. Alyres' belong to a gang of murderous thieves who bury their victims alive, having first paralysed them with a mysterious drug. The hero, young Richard Beckett, besotted with the gang's actress accomplice, narrowly escapes becoming the latest victim of their dastardly scheme. In the prologue Le Fanu describes the catalepsy-inducing drug employed by the St. Alyres as one of a class of 25 or so philtres known to mediaeval physicians, two of which are still used by the criminals of Dr. Hesselius’s day. The effects of the (fictional) drug, however, are curiously reminiscent of those of the alkaloid bulbocapnine, which occurs in the medicinal herb Corydalis cava, a plant known to mediaeval herbalists.

Carmilla

A tale of a female vampire, set in Styria, Austria. This story was to greatly influence Bram Stoker in writing Dracula (1897). It also served as the basis for several works in other media, such as Danish director Carl Theodor Dreyer's film Vampyr (1932); Hammer's film The Vampire Lovers (1970); Carmilla, a Canadian web series starring Natasha Negovanlis and Elise Bauman; and Carmilla (2019).

Reception
In a letter to Sidney Colvin from W.E. Henley, Henley stated that his friend Robert Louis Stevenson admired the book. Henley said "In a Glass Darkly was a book for which R.L.S. had a profound respect." Henley also said that the book had inspired his and Stevenson's play, The Hanging Judge.

References

External links
 
 
 

1872 short story collections
Fantasy short story collections
Occult detective fiction
Short story collections by Sheridan Le Fanu
Horror short story collections